The Constitutional Court of the Italian Republic is the highest court of Italy in matters of constitutional law. Sometimes, the name Consulta is used as a metonym for it, because its sessions are held in Palazzo della Consulta in Rome.

History
The court is a post-World War II innovation.

The Court was established by the republican Constitution of Italy in 1948, but it became operative only in 1955 after the enactment of the Constitutional Law n. 1 of 1953 and the Law n. 87 of 1953. It held its first hearing in 1956.

Powers 

According to Article 134  of the Italian Constitution, the Court shall pass judgement on

 controversies on the constitutional legitimacy of laws issued by the State and Regions and when the Court declares a law unconstitutional, the law ceases to have effect the day after the publication of the ruling;
 conflicts arising from allocation of powers of the State and those powers allocated to State and Regions, and between Regions;
 charges brought against the President.

The constitutional court passes on the constitutionality of laws with no right of appeal.

Since 12 October 2007, when reform of the Italian intelligence agencies approved in August 2007 came into force, the pretext of state secret cannot be used to deny access to documents by the Court.

Composition

The Constitutional Court is composed of 15 judges for the term of service of nine years: 5 appointed by the President, 5 elected by the Parliament of Italy and 5 elected by the ordinary and administrative supreme courts. Candidates need to be either lawyers with twenty years or more experience, full professors of law, or (former) judges of the Supreme Administrative, Civil and Criminal tribunals. The members then elect the President of the Court. The President is elected from among its members in a secret ballot, by an absolute majority (8 votes in the case of a full court). If no person gets a majority, a runoff election between the two judges with the most votes occurs. The President of the Court appoints one or more vice-presidents to stand in for him in the event of his absence for any reason.

Current membership
Appointed by

See also
List of presidents of the Constitutional Court of Italy

References

External links
 Official website

Judiciary of Italy
Italy
Italy
Italian constitutional institutions
1955 establishments in Italy
Courts and tribunals established in 1955